Ratibořské Hory is a municipality and village in Tábor District in the South Bohemian Region of the Czech Republic. It has about 800 inhabitants.

Administrative parts
Villages of Dub, Malenín, Podolí, Ratibořice and Vřesce are administrative parts of Ratibořské Hory.

History
Ratibořské Hory was founded in 1527 and further developed during the 16th century into a mining town because of growing mining activities, mostly of the silver ores. Mineworkers were coming from Ore Mountain Mining Region. After the Thirty Years' War a new rise in silver mining occurred after 1737 under lordship of the Schwarzenbergs and at the end of the 18th century the population reached its peak of over 2,000.

References

Villages in Tábor District